The women's 100 metres T37 event at the 2020 Summer Paralympics in Tokyo, took place between 1 and 2 September 2021.

Records
Prior to the competition, the existing records were as follows:

Results

Heats
Heat 1 took place on 1 September 2021, at 21:46:

Heat 2 took place on 1 September 2021, at 21:52:

Final
The final took place on 2 September 2021, at 10:37:

References

Men's 100 metres T37
2021 in women's athletics